NGC 3005 is an edge-on spiral galaxy in the constellation of Ursa Major, discovered by Bindon Stoney on January 25, 1851. It is a member of the NGC 2998 group, which also includes NGC 2998, NGC 3002, NGC 3006, NGC 3008, and a few others.

References

External links 
 

Intermediate spiral galaxies
Galaxies discovered in 1851
Ursa Major (constellation)
3005
028232